The New Haydon Bridge is a bridge across the River South Tyne providing access to and from the village of Haydon Bridge.

History
The bridge, which was built by Kier Group to carry the A69 road across the River South Tyne, was completed in 1970.

References

Bridges in Northumberland
Crossings of the River Tyne
Bridges completed in 1970